Sodiq Abubakar Yusuf (born May 6, 1985), popularly known by his stage name CDQ, is a Nigerian indigenous hip-hop rapper and songwriter best known for his single "Nowo E Soke" featuring Wizkid and Masterkraft's Indomie where he was featured alongside Olamide. While the former is instrumental for launching his career into the Nigerian music industry, the later won him his first career award at the 2016 Nigerian Music Video Awards. Signed to his label No Struggle No Success Entertainment, CDQ's repertoire of music includes rapping in Yoruba language with addition of ad-libs such as the popular "Woss Wobi" which he invented.

Early life and education
Sodiq Abubakar Yusuf  is a native of Ilorin, Kwara State, Nigeria; but was born in Orile, a suburb of Lagos. Upon moving back to Lagos State from Ilorin where he had completed his secondary school education, he proceeded to further his education at Lagos State University where he graduated with a B.Sc in Economics.

The rapper shocked many as he floats the initiative by giving back to the society. He travelled to Kwara State, where he hails from to launch the scheme.

The singer also paid a courtesy visit to the Emir of Ilorin during the first day of his arrival to discuss his intentions and plans for the secondary school students within the state.

His 2-days trip was filled with activities as he and his team were well received by the school as the Principal of the school organised a special assembly gathering to receive one of their own. The musician gave writing materials and wall clocks to the students.

Speaking on the initiative, the musician’s publicist said; “The (CEEI) project is targeted at solving writing materials problems in the state as all the secondary schools in Kwara State will get to benefit from it.”

Career
CDQ started music professionally in 2008 when he used to be a back-up singer for Da Grin before he started rapping in English language with M.I. In 2013, he signed a recording contract with Masterkraft's General Records after winning a rap battle at the weekly Industry Nite in December 2012. In 2014, he released his breakthrough single titled "Indomie" which featured vocals from Olamide while the remix of the song featured Davido. The Masterkraft-produced song brought CDQ's career to limelight and further earned him two nomination spots at the 2015 Nigeria Entertainment Awards and a nomination in the Best Street-Hop Artist category at The Headies 2015.

In anticipation of his debut studio album titled Quality, CDQ enlisted the service of Wizkid with whom he released "Nowo E Soke" as a lead single off the album. The music video for the song was directed by Unlimited L.A and went on to win the Best Afro Hip Hop Video category at the 2016 edition of the Nigeria Music Video Awards. On 16 August 2016, he unveiled the cover art for the album before it was released through General Records on 22 August to positive critical reviews. On 11 November 2016, he launched his own record label N.S.N.S, a short-form for No Struggle No Success Entertainment. On 1 Feb 2017,  he dropped his first official single under the platform  titled ' Say Baba ' which was produced by Jay Pizzle.

Discography

Selected singles

Studio albums
Quality
Ibile Mugabe

Awards and nominations

References

1985 births
Living people
People from Ilorin
Nigerian rappers
Lagos State University alumni
Nigerian songwriters
Nigerian hip hop musicians